Stéphanie Di Giusto (also known by her former pseudonym "Paf le chien") is a French film director, photographer and art director.

Life and career
After her studies at the École nationale supérieure des arts décoratifs and ESAG Penninghen in Paris, Di Giusto began her career in advertising work for Orange and designing credits for the  television network France 5. She subsequently directed music videos for Elsa Lunghini, Camille, NYPC, Rose, Brigitte Fontaine and Sliimy, among others. She has also collaborated with Vanessa Bruno, creating video installations and shorts for the designer's collections.

In 2016, her feature directorial debut, The Dancer, was selected to be screened at the Cannes Film Festival as part of the Un Certain Regard section.

Filmography

References

External links
 
 IMVDb profile

Living people
French music video directors
French art directors
French women photographers
French film directors
French women film directors
French women screenwriters
French screenwriters
Year of birth missing (living people)
Women graphic designers